The family Pandalidae is a taxon of caridean shrimp. These species are commonly called pandalid shrimp. They are edible and have high economic value. They are characterised by the subdivided carpus of the second pereiopod and, mainly, by the lack of the chelae (claws) on the first pereiopod. This is a cold-water family, and their representation in tropical areas is made by deep-sea shrimp. The genus Physetocaris, sometimes placed in this family, is now considered to be in its own family, Physetocarididae.

Genera
The following genera are currently classified in the family Pandalidae:

Anachlorocurtis Hayashi, 1975
Atlantopandalus Komai, 1999
Austropandalus Holthuis, 1952
Bitias Fransen, 1990
Calipandalus Komai & Chan, 2003
Chelonika Fransen, 1997
Chlorocurtis Kemp, 1925
Chlorotocella Balss, 1914
Chlorotocus A. Milne-Edwards, 1882
Dichelopandalus Caullery, 1896
Dorodotes Bate, 1888
Heterocarpus A. Milne-Edwards, 1881b
Miropandalus Bruce, 1983
Notopandalus Yaldwyn, 1960
Pandalina Calman, 1899
Pandalus Leach, 1814
Pantomus A. Milne-Edwards, 1883
Peripandalus De Man, 1917
Plesionika Bate, 1888
Procletes Bate, 1888
Pseudopandalus Crosnier, 1997
Stylopandalus Coutière, 1905

References

Caridea
Decapod families